Ortega is a Spanish surname.  Refer to this article for a list of prominent people named Ortega.

Ortega may also refer to:

Places
Ortega, Tolima, town in Colombia
Ortega, California (disambiguation)
Ortega, Jacksonville, historic neighborhood on the west bank of the St. Johns River in Jacksonville, Florida
Ortega Highway, name of a portion of California State Route 74

Others
Ortega (grape), a white variety of grape
Ortega (brand name), a brand name of Mexican food items sold in North America since the early 1980s
Ortega y Gasset Awards, given to Spanish journalists

See also
Artega (disambiguation)